Microtis, Latin for "small-eared" is the generic name of two groups of organisms. It can refer to:

Microtis (gastropod) in the family Trochidae
Microtis (plant) in the family Orchidaceae

See also
 Atelocynus microtis, a mammal species
 Brucella micotis, a species of Gram-negative bacteria
 Felis microtis, a synonym of Prionailurus bengalensis, leopard cat 
 Graphiurus microtis, a rodent species
 Lepus microtis, a mammal species
 Lerista microtis, a lizard species
 Mantidactylus microtis, a frog species
 Micronycteris microtis, a bat species
 Microtus, a genus of voles
 Nyctophilus microtis, a bat species
 Oligoryzomys microtis, a rodent species
 Omoglymmius microtis, a beetle species